Tugsuu Idersaikhan (born June 11, 1992, in Ulaanbaatar) is a Mongolian beauty pageant contestant and a fashion model who represented Mongolia in the Miss International and Miss Earth pageants.

References

1992 births
Living people
Miss Earth 2014 contestants
Miss International 2011 delegates
Mongolian beauty pageant winners
People from Ulaanbaatar